A proxy fight, proxy contest or proxy battle (sometimes even called a proxy war) is an unfriendly contest for the control over an organization. The event usually occurs when a corporation's stockholders develop opposition to some aspect of the corporate governance, often focusing on directorial and management positions. Corporate activists may attempt to persuade shareholders to use their proxy votes (i.e., votes by one individual or institution as the authorized representative of another) to install new management for any of a variety of reasons. Shareholders of a public corporation may appoint an agent to attend shareholder meetings and vote on their behalf. That agent is the shareholder's proxy.

In a proxy fight, incumbent directors and management have the odds stacked in their favor over those trying to force the corporate change. These incumbents use various corporate governance tactics to stay in power, including: staggering the boards (i.e., having different election years for different directors), controlling access to the corporation's money, and creating restrictive requirements in the bylaws. As a result, most proxy fights are unsuccessful; except those waged more recently by hedge funds, which are successful more than 60% of the time. However, previous studies have found that proxy fights are positively correlated with an increase in shareholder wealth.

Examples
An acquiring company, frustrated by the takeover defenses of the management, may initiate a proxy fight to install a more compliant management of the target.
Internal opponents to an impending takeover (viewing it will cut value or add much risk) may enter into a proxy fight. Such took place within Hewlett-Packard, before Carly Fiorina's management of that company in 2002 took over Compaq.
Absent any looming takeover, proxy fights emerge from shareholders unhappy with management, with or without legal and equitable derivative suit grounds, as with Carl Icahn's effort in 2005–06 to oust most the board of Time Warner.
An early history of proxy fighting, detailing such 1950s battles as the fight for control of some of U.S. largest corporations, including the Bank of America and the New York Central Railroad, can be found in David Karr's 1956 volume, Fight for Control.

Key players
Due to their out-sized influence with many institutional investors, proxy advisors play a key role in many proxy fights. In many cases, the proxy firms end up determining the result of the contest. The Securities Exchange Act of 1934 also gave the Securities and Exchange Commission (SEC) the power to regulate the solicitation of proxies. Some of the rules the SEC has since proposed, like the universal proxy, have been controversial because opponents have suggested that they would increase the amount of proxy fights.

See also 

 Proxy statement

References

Business terms
Corporate law
Shareholders
Mergers and acquisitions
Corporate warfare